Monte Montague (April 23, 1891 – April 6, 1959) was the stage name for Walter H. Montague, an American film actor. He appeared in more than 190 films between 1920 and 1954. He was born in Somerset, Kentucky, and died in Burbank, California in 1959, at age 67.

Partial filmography

 Elmo the Fearless (1920)
 The Flaming Disc (1920)
 A Western Demon (1922)
 The Three Buckaroos (1922)
 Peaceful Peters (1922)
 The Great Circus Mystery (1925)
 Ace of Spades (1925)
 The Scarlet Streak (1925)
 The Radio Detective (1926)
 The Mystery Club (1926)
 The Wild Horse Stampede (1926)
 Hey! Hey! Cowboy (1927)
 Range Courage (1927)
 Rough and Ready (1927)
 Blake of Scotland Yard (1927)
 The Noose (1928)
 Clearing the Trail (1928)
 The Price of Fear (1928)
 The Danger Rider (1928)
 King of the Rodeo (1929)
 The Diamond Master (1929)
 The Tip Off (1929)
 The Ace of Scotland Yard (1929)
 Courtin' Wildcats (1929)
 Trigger Tricks (1930)
 The Lonesome Trail (1930)
 The Spell of the Circus (1931)
 The Hawk (1931)
 Finger Prints (1931)
 Heroes of the Flames (1931)
 Quick Trigger Lee (1931)
 Trapped (1931)
 The Shadow of the Eagle (1932)
 Texas Cyclone (1932)
 Impatient Maiden (1932)
 The Vanishing Shadow (1934)
 The Red Rider (1934)
 Rocky Rhodes (1934)
 Song of the Saddle (1936)
 Treachery Rides the Range (1936)
 Tarzan Escapes (1936)
 Guns of the Pecos (1937)
 Riders of the Black Hills (1938)
 Pals of the Saddle (1938)
 The Renegade Ranger (1938)
 Code of the Streets (1939)
 Racketeers of the Range (1939)
 Allegheny Uprising (1939)
 Arizona Legion (1939)
 The Rookie Cop (1939)
 Wagon Train (1940)
 Young Bill Hickok (1940)
 The Apache Kid (1941)
 Man from Cheyenne (1942)
 The Cyclone Kid (1942)
 The Phantom Plainsmen (1942)
 Thundering Hoofs (1942)
 Rustlers (1949)
 The Pecos Pistol (1949)
 The Last Musketeer (1952)
 Calamity Jane (1953)

References

External links

1891 births
1959 deaths
American male film actors
American male silent film actors
Male actors from Kentucky
Male Western (genre) film actors
People from Somerset, Kentucky
20th-century American male actors